The National Party of Australia – Victoria is a political party in Victoria, which forms the state branch of the federal Nationals. Historically, it represented graziers, farmers and rural voters. However, the modern National Party no longer generally represents these traditional interests, shifting its focus to support the mining industry. 

The Victorian Farmer's Union formed in 1914 was the precursor to the Victorian Country Party, later the Nationals.

The party, commonly referred to as "The Nationals," is presently the junior partner in a centre-right Coalition with the Liberal Party, forming a joint Opposition bench.  During periods of conservative government, the leader also serves as Deputy Premier of Victoria.

Name
The candidates sponsored by the Victorian Farmers' Union initially used the same name but in parliament also called themselves the Country Party. In 1927 the VFU was reorganised and renamed as the Victorian Country Party. A separate party, the Country Progressive Party, had been formed in April 1926 but merged with the Victorian Country Party in September 1930, with the combined party now named the United Country Party. "United" was dropped from the name in March 1947. On 24 July 1975 the party changed its name to the National Party, following the Queensland branch who had made the change the previous year. From 1999 to 2003, it was popularly known as the VicNats. In 2003, in tandem with the national party, it rebranded as The Nationals, although the official name remains the National Party of Australia.

History
In 1937, United Country Party federal MP John McEwen was expelled from the state branch for accepting a ministry in the Lyons-Page Coalition government. Following a tumultuous party conference in 1938, another federal MP, Thomas Paterson, led a hundred McEwen supporters to form the Liberal Country Party (LCP), a faction of the party loyal to the federal party. In April 1943, the party reconciled with the LCP. In the state election in June, the two parties notionally fielded separate candidates but formed a single block.

Relationship with Liberals

The party has had a strained relationship with the Liberals for most of the time since the end of World War II. Following the sacking of Country Party leader John McDonald as Deputy Premier by the Liberals in 1948, in March 1949, the Liberals dissolved and formed the Liberal and Country Party, attempting to merge the Liberals and the Victorian branch of the Country Party together. However, this was seen by McDonald as a takeover attempt of the Country Party. Six Country MPs defected and joined the new party, which in 1965 became simply known as the Liberals.

While its federal counterpart has been in Coalition with the Liberals and their predecessors for all but a few years since 1923, the Victorian Country (and later Nationals) branch fought elections separately from the Liberals from 1952 to 1989. Even the presence of Victorian John McEwen as federal Country Party leader and the number-two man in the government from 1958 to 1971 didn't heal the breach.

Pat McNamara became leader of the Victorian Nationals in 1988, and two years later reached a new Coalition agreement with the Liberals. The Liberals and Nationals fought the 1992, 1996 and 1999 elections as a Coalition under Jeff Kennett. The Liberals actually won majorities in their own right in 1992 and 1996. Although Kennett thus had no need for the support of the Nationals, he retained the Coalition, with McNamara as Deputy Premier.

However, after the Kennett government's shock defeat in 1999, McNamara's successor as Nationals leader, Peter Ryan, tore up the Coalition agreement. The Nationals were steadily re-defining themselves as a party distinct from the Liberals.  Soon after Ryan took over the leadership, they rebranded themselves as the "VicNats."  Ryan uttered several sharp criticisms of the Liberals' most prominent figures, particularly their no-tolls policy on the Melbourne Eastlink freeway and on former leader Robert Doyle's remarks that the Liberals were twenty seats from government, a statement that assumed that the Nationals would support a Liberal government.

In mid-2000, McNamara left the parliament and his hitherto safe seat of Benalla was also lost to the ALP.  At the 2002 election, the Nationals received 4.3% of the primary vote, maintaining their seven seats in the Assembly and four seats in the Council; the combined total of eleven was the minimum required to maintain Third Party status. However, they did manage to win back Benalla despite the ALP landslide; the only seat the ALP lost at that election.

Relations with the Liberal Party soured further at the beginning of 2006 when Senator Julian McGauran defected from the Nationals to the Liberals. Federal party leader Mark Vaile accused McGauran of betrayal. Ryan was equally unsparing, saying of McGauran, "People treat deserters exactly in the way that this fellow will be treated and reviled for the rest of his days. And justifiably so."

2006 election
Many commentators had stated that The Nationals were facing electoral oblivion at the 2006 election, especially when rumours emerged of a possible preference deal between the Liberals and the ALP which would favour the Liberals against the Nationals, and the ALP against the Greens. Changes to the Upper House were also likely to slash the Nationals from four members to just one.  Ten days prior to the election, Ryan gave what one commentator described the "speech of the campaign thus far" when he lambasted the major parties for their planned actions.

"Welcome", he said, "to Survivor Spring Street", an exercise in reality politics in which "associations that in some instances have been developed for years, amount to an absolute hill of beans", one in which the support offered through long-standing political partnership "is thrown back in your face".

The Nationals went on to increase their primary vote to 5.17%, winning two seats in the Assembly which were offset by two losses in the Legislative Council (the upper house). One notable victory was in Mildura, where Peter Crisp defeated the incumbent Russell Savage (one of the three independents who had removed the Nationals from power in 1999), an event which Ryan described as "an impossible dream".

Premier Steve Bracks resigned unexpectedly in July 2007.  Unlike the Liberal leader, Ted Baillieu, Ryan commended Bracks on his parliamentary career and thanked him for his professionalism. This action is in step with what one commentator describes as "an unprecedented warm relationship with the state Labor Government", which includes reciprocating support for committee chairs.

Coalition
The Nationals stayed on the crossbench until 2008, when they formed a Coalition with the Liberals under Ted Baillieu. The renewed Coalition narrowly won the 2010 state election, but was ousted after one term in 2014. The Coalition arrangement was maintained while the two parties were in opposition.

According to The Age, between November 2018 and November 2021, the Coalition's Legislative Council members voted with the Andrews Government's position 28.9% of the time; of the parties in the Legislative Council, only the Liberal Democratic Party had a lower figure (22.1%).

Victorian Nationals leaders

Victorian Nationals deputy leaders

Election results
Note that until the 1960s some seats were uncontested, which can distort the vote shares.

  In 1943 the party reconciled with the breakaway Liberal Country Party. The two parties notionally fielded separate candidates but formed a single block; the table shows the combined result for the parties. The Country Party received 112,164 votes (13.03%) and 18 seats, the Liberal Country Party, standing as the Victorian Country Party, 11,738 votes (1.36%) and 7 seats, 6 of them unopposed.

Federal Elections

See also
:Category:National Party of Australia members of the Parliament of Victoria

References

External links

1914 establishments in Australia
Victoria
Political parties in Victoria (Australia)